

Adikhalamani was a Kushite King of Meroe dating to the 2nd century BCE. Adikhalamani was the successor of King Arqamani and was later succeeded by a king whose name has only partially survived: (...)mr(...)t. He is said to be contemporary with an Egyptian revolt dated to ca. 207-186 BCE. During this revolt a ruler, Horwennefer (who may have been a Nubian) took control of Thebes and revolted against Ptolemy IV Philopator. The revolt ended ca. 186 BCE when Ankhwennefer (his successor or more likely Horwennefer with a different nomen) was captured and executed.

Titles
Prenomen: Titenre Setepnetjeru ("Image of Re, chosen of the Gods")
Nomen: Adikhalamani with epithet Meryiset

Monuments and inscriptions
 
Adikhalamani was buried at Meroe in Beg. N 9.
Adikhalamani initiated the building of the Temple of Debod, which contains reliefs showing the king offering to various deities, including Amun, Mut, Osiris, Isis, Harpocrates, Nekhbet and Wadjet.

References

Literature
Laszlo Török, in: Fontes Historiae Nubiorum, Vol. II, Bergen 1996, 511-520, 
2nd-century BC monarchs of Kush
2nd-century BC rulers in Africa